Murdock is an unincorporated community in Lawrence County, Indiana, United States. It was originally developed around a rail yard.

References

Unincorporated communities in Lawrence County, Indiana
Unincorporated communities in Indiana